John Hargrave (by 1499 – 1541 or later) was an English politician.

He was a Member (MP) of the Parliament of England for Stamford in 1529.

References

15th-century births
16th-century deaths
English MPs 1529–1536